Trevor Preston was a British screenwriter. He wrote the series Out and created the series Ace of Wands. He also wrote a 1976 TV movie adaptation of James and the Giant Peach.

Writing credits

1960s work
1966
 Four People (serial) (2 episodes)
1967
 The Lion, the Witch and the Wardrobe (serial) (adaptation - 10 episodes)
 The Pilgrim's Progress  (serial) (adaptation - 3 episodes)
1968
 Freewheelers (series) (writer - 4 episodes)
 The Tyrant King (series) (6 episodes)
1969
 The Incredible Adventures of Professor Branestawm (series) (adaptation - 7 episodes)

1970s work
1971
 The Mind of Mr. J.G. Reeder (series) (dramatised by - 1 episode)
 Public Eye (series) (by - 1 episode)
1972
 Callan (series) (by - 2 episodes, 1970 - 1972) (writer - 1 episode, 1969)
 Ace of Wands (series) (creator - 46 episodes, 1970 - 1972) (writer - 3 episodes, 1970)
1973
 Love Story (series) (writer - 1 episode)
 Special Branch (series) (by - 3 episodes, 1969 - 1973) (writer - 1 episode, 1970)
 The Protectors (series) (writer - 5 episodes)
1974
 The Aweful Mr. Goodall (series) (writer - 1 episode)
 Rooms (series) (written by - 2 episodes)
1975
 Six Days of Justice (series) (writer - 3 episodes, 1972 - 1975) (screenplay - 1 episode, 1973)
 Couples (series) (writer - 4 episodes)
1976
 James and the Giant Peach (TV Movie) (adapted by)
1978
 Out (series) (written by - 6 episodes)
 Premiere (series) (writer - 1 episode)
 The Sweeney (series) (1 episode, 1974) (written by - 11 episodes, 1975 - 1978
 Hazell (TV Series) (writer - 2 episodes)
1979
 The Dick Francis Thriller: The Racing Game (series) (written by - 1 episode)

1980s work
1980
 Fox (series) (written by - 13 episodes)
1983
 Slayground (writer)
1984
 Minder (series) (written by - 1 episode)
 Dramarama (series) (by - 1 episode)
1985
 Bones
1987
 Billy the Kid and the Green Baize Vampire (feature film)

1990s work
1990
 Screen Two (series) (writer - 1 episode)
1993
 Thicker Than Water (TV Movie)
1994
 The Negotiator (TV Movie)
 Ruth Rendell Mysteries (series) (adaptation - 4 episodes, 1990 - 1994) (writer - 2 episodes, 1992 - 1994) (screenplay - 1 episode, 1989)
1998
 Little White Lies (TV Movie)

2000s work
2000
 The Secret Adventures of Jules Verne (series) (screenplay - 2 episodes)
2003
 I'll Sleep When I'm Dead (written by)

External links

1938 births
2018 deaths
British television writers